Andrés Eduardo Sánchez Rodríguez (born 3 October 1997) is a Mexican professional footballer who plays as a goalkeeper for Liga MX club Atlético San Luis.

Career statistics

Club

Honours
Tepatitlán
Liga de Expansión MX: Guardianes 2021
Campeón de Campeones: 2021

References

External links
 
 
 

Living people
1998 births
Mexican footballers
Association football goalkeepers
Liga de Expansión MX players
Atlético San Luis footballers
Liga MX players
Salamanca CF UDS players
Segunda División B players
Footballers from Chihuahua
Sportspeople from Ciudad Juárez
Mexican expatriate footballers
Mexican expatriate sportspeople in Spain
Expatriate footballers in Spain